Stapfiella muricata is a shrub native to Zaïre, Africa. It grows in the undergrowth of rainforests, at altitudes of 900 m. 

S. muricata can grow up to 1 meter tall and has white flowers. It differs from other members of Stapfiella phenotypically by its 5 - 9mm panicles, glabrous branches and large acuminate leaves.

References 

Passifloraceae